Kuruköprü Monumental Church, is the former Agios Nikolaos Greek Orthodox Church located in the Kuruköprü area of the city of Adana. The church now serves as a historical site for touristic visits.

Agios Nikolaos Greek Orthodox Church was built in 1845 by the Greek community of the city. It was in service until 1910s and was abandoned after the departure of the community in the Greco-Turkish population exchange.  The church was converted into Archaeology Museum in 1950. After the move of the Archaeology Museum to a new location, the former church was occupied by the newly formed Ethnography Museum in 1983. The church is restored to its origin in 2015 and renamed Kuruköprü Monumental Church.

Gallery

References

See also
Christianity in Turkey

Greek Orthodox churches in Turkey
Landmarks in Adana
Buildings and structures in Adana
Former churches in Turkey